The 1993–94 All-Ireland Senior Club Hurling Championship was the 24th staging of the All-Ireland Senior Club Hurling Championship, the Gaelic Athletic Association's premier inter-county club hurling tournament. The championship began on 26 September 1993 and ended on 17 March 1993.

Sarsfields were the defending champions. Rathmoylan of Meath, Slaughtneil of Derry and Dicksboro of Kilkenny made their first appearances in the championship.

On 17 March 1994, Sarsfields won the championship following a 1-14 to 3-06 defeat of Toomevara in the All-Ireland final. This was their second All-Ireland title in succession.

Mike Nolan of Toomevara was the championship's top scorer with 1-38.

Results

Connacht Senior Club Hurling Championship

First round

Quarter-final

Semi-finalFinalLeinster Senior Hurling ChampionshipFirst roundQuarter-finalsSemi-finalsFinalMunster Senior Hurling ChampionshipQuarter-finalSemi-finalsFinalUlster Senior Club Hurling ChampionshipSemi-finalsFinalAll-Ireland Senior Hurling ChampionshipQuarter-finalSemi-finalsFinal'''

Championship statistics

Top scorers

Overall

In a single game

Miscellaneous

 Ballycran win the Ulster title for the first time since 1976.

References

1993 in hurling
1994 in hurling
All-Ireland Senior Club Hurling Championship